East Canton High School is a public high school in East Canton, Ohio.  It is the only high school in the Osnaburg Local School District.  Although the school's athletic teams have the mascot of the Hornets, the East Canton's girls' basketball team is nicknamed the Wizards. The East Canton boys cross country team has also been nicknamed the packmen due to their excellent pack running.

State championships

 Boys Cross Country – 1998 
 Boys Track and Field - 2017, 2018, 2019 
 Boys Cross Country 1998, 2017, 2020, 2021

Individual Track and Field State Champions:
Joe Bradley - 100m, 200m, 400m (1981)
Shane Cline - Shot Put (2001)
Cody Marshall- Pole Vault (2010)
Josh Conrad - 800m (2018)

Notable alumni
Jean Peters Class of 1944

External links
 District Website

References

High schools in Stark County, Ohio
Public high schools in Ohio